Karlı is a village in the Yüksekova District of Hakkâri Province in Turkey. The village is populated by Kurds of the Doski tribe and had a population of 1,064 in 2022.

The hamlets of Bakırlı, Beşpınar, Çaylı, Çiceközü, Çimenli, Karabağ and Kilimli are attached to the village.

Population 
Population history of the village from 2000 to 2022:

References 

Villages in Yüksekova District
Kurdish settlements in Hakkâri Province